Beech Bottom is an unincorporated community in Macon County, Tennessee, in the United States.

History
The community was named for a grove of beech trees near the low-lying town site.

References

Unincorporated communities in Macon County, Tennessee
Unincorporated communities in Tennessee